Victoria Museum, now called Supreme Court Registry, Karachi, founded as Victoria and Albert Museum, is a building in Karachi which houses the Supreme Court of Pakistan Karachi registry branch.

History
The building was originally built during the British Raj. It was founded by the Duke of Connaught in 1887 during the reign of Queen Victoria as a museum then known as Victoria and Elbert Museum.

In July 1948, Muhammad Ali Jinnah, founder of Pakistan, laid the foundation for the State Bank of Pakistan.

On 21 May 1892, it was converted into a full museum and named Victoria Museum. It had stuffed animals, artefacts from the Mohenjo-daro, statues of people of Hind and abroad, portraits, paintings, and pictures of famous people from around the world.

In October 1957, an apex court registry was established in Karachi in the building.

References

State Bank of Pakistan
Tourist attractions in Karachi
Supreme Court of Pakistan
Museums established in 1887
1887 establishments in British India
Heritage sites in Karachi